HD 83446 is a probable astrometric binary star system in the constellation Vela. It is visible to the naked eye with an apparent visual magnitude of 4.34. The system is moving further away with a heliocentric radial velocity of +18 km/s.

The visible component is an A-type main-sequence star with a stellar classification of A7 V. Observations with the BRITE constellation led to this star's identification as a Delta Scuti variable with pulsation frequencies of 31.0806 and 34.2098 cycles per day, corresponding to periods of 46.3 and 42.1 minutes, respectively. It has a high rate of spin with a projected rotational velocity of 155 km/s, which is giving the star an oblate shape with an equatorial bulge that is 6% larger than the polar radius. The star is roughly 453 million years old with 1.8 times the mass of the Sun. It is radiating 16 times the Sun's luminosity from its photosphere at an effective temperature of 8,331 K.

References

A-type main-sequence stars
Delta Scuti variables
Vela (constellation)
Velorum, M
Durchmusterung objects
083446
047175
3836